Shilpa Shastras literally means the Science of Shilpa (arts and crafts). It is an ancient umbrella term for numerous Hindu texts that describe arts, crafts, and their design rules, principles and standards. In the context of Hindu temple architecture and sculpture, Shilpa Shastras were manuals for sculpture and Hindu iconography, prescribing among other things, the proportions of a sculptured figure, composition, principles, meaning, as well as rules of architecture.

Sixty-four techniques for such arts or crafts, sometimes called  "external or practical arts", are traditionally enumerated, including carpentry, architecture, jewellery, farriery, acting, dancing, music, medicine, poetry etc., besides sixty-four  or "secret arts", which include mostly "erotic arts" such as kissing, embracing, etc. (Monier-Williams s.v. ).

While Shilpa and Vastu Shastras are related, Shilpa Shastras deal with arts and crafts such as forming statues, icons, stone murals, painting, carpentry, pottery, jewellery, dying, textiles and others. Vastu Shastras deal with building architecture – building houses, forts, temples, apartments, village and town layout, etc.

Description
Shilpa (शिल्प) refers to any art or craft in ancient Indian texts, while Shastra means science. Together, Shilpa Shastra means the science of art and crafts. The ancient Sanskrit texts use the term Shilpin (शिल्पिन्, male artist) and Shilpini (शिल्पिनी, female artist) for artists and crafts person, while Shilpani refers to works of arts of man.

The meaning of Shilpa, according to Stella Kramrisch, is complex. She writes that it consists of "art, skill, craft, labor, ingenuity, rite and ritual, form and creation." The range of crafts encompassed by the term Shilpa extends to every aspect of culture, includes sculptor, the potter, the perfumer, the wheelwright, the painter, the weaver, the architect, the dancer, the musician, the arts of love, and others. Ancient Indian texts assert that the number of the arts is unlimited, they deploy sixty four kala (कला, techniques) and thirty two  (विद्या, fields of knowledge). Shilpa is discussed in Agamas, Puranas and Vastu Shastra where it is linked to the mythology of Vishvakarma.

In painting
Shilpa Shastras include chapters on paintings, both miniature and large. For example, Narada Shilpa Shastra dedicates chapters 66 and 71 to painting, while Saraswati Shilpa Shastra describes various types of chitra (full painting), ardhachitra (sketch work), chitrabhasa (communication through painting), varna samskara (preparation of colors).

Other ancient Shilpa Shastra on painting include Vishnudharmottara Purana and Chitralakshana, former is available in Sanskrit while the only surviving copies of latter are in Tibetan (both were originally written on birch bark, and have been translated into English and German). These Sanskrit treatises discuss the following aspects of a painting: measurement, proportions, perspective of the viewer, mudra, emotions, and rasa (meaning). Such an approach of Indian paintings, states Isabella Nardi, make Shilpa Shastra not only canonical textual sources but also a means to transmit knowledge and spiritual themes.

In carpentry
The first chapter of Shilpa Shastra Manasara discusses the measurement principles for carpentry. One of the earliest mentions of carpentry arts is in Book 9, Chapter 112 of Rig Veda. Carpentry was also an essential Shilpa Shastra during the construction of a Hindu temple.

In metallurgy

The Vedas, in particular Atharva veda and Sthapatya veda, describe many kinds of arts and crafts in their discussion of Shilpa Shastra and Yantra Sarvasva.

Sanskrit texts such as Shilparatna and Manasara describe in detail the process and principles for art work with metals, particularly for alloys such as panchadhatu (five metals – zinc, tin, copper, silver and gold) and ashtadhatu (eight metal alloys – which adds iron, lead and mercury to panchadhatu). Madhuchista Vidhana (cire perdue or lost wax) casting process is the most discussed process in these ancient shilpa shastras with metals. Kirk suggests that these Shastras diffused from India to other ancient cultures in Asia.

While there is empirical evidence of high purity metallurgy and art works with other metals, some ancient Shilpa Shastras have been lost. For example, the 5th century Iron Pillar of Delhi, which stands 23 feet, weighs 6 tonnes and contains 99.72% iron without showing any signs of rust, is empirical evidence of the state of metallurgical arts in 5th century India.

Shilpa Shastra education in ancient India
No barriers
All arts were the domain of all classes, both genders in ancient India. The ancient texts of Parashara states that all crafts were practised by anyone irrespective of family's occupation. The Buddhist Jatakas mention Brahmana carpenters, the 4th century text Baudhayana describes chariot builders, carpenters, brick-workers, potters and metal workers from people of people classified as Kshatriya, Vaishya and Shudra. Suttavibhanga describes builders and wheelwrights born to Shudra father and Brahmana mother. The goldsmiths of Maharashtra included children born in cattle herding families. There is no particular community in  Assam Valley that is exclusive to traditional crafts such as bamboo and cane. Present day, it is done by particularly the peasants irrespective of caste, community or creed.

Apprenticeship
Apprentices joined and trained under masters. The best were adopted and recognised as members of various art guilds. The training began from childhood, and included studies about dharma, culture, reading, writing, mathematics, geometry, colors, tools, as well as trade secrets – these were called Tradition.

Guilds
Shilpins had formed śreṇi (guilds) in ancient India. Each guild formed its own laws and code of conduct, one the ancient Hindu and Buddhist kings of India respected by tradition. In some cases, the king established the laws of the guilds; in some cases, the king's treasurer had the final word and served as judge of various guilds in a kingdom. These guilds, in the 1st millennium BC, included all those who practised the art irrespective of the artist's caste or creed. The income of each guild came from fees paid by new members joining the guild, from fines on those violating the code of conduct established by the guild, and levies on tools used for that art. The guilds also performed charity and gifted collective works of art by their members to temples and other social works. During festivals and social celebrations, each guild would contribute their own performance and pavilions with flags and emblems.

Art is spiritual
Creative work and artists were granted the sanctions of a sacrament in ancient Indian culture, states Stella Kramrisch. An artist expresses the spiritual and holiness in his or her art. This belief continues to manifest itself in modern India in the form of rituals, where in an autumn festival (Dashahra), craftsmen in parts of India worship their tools with incense, flowers and unhusked rice.

Brhat Samhita at verses 57.10-11 describes the practice of carpenters offering prayers and seeking forgiveness of a tree before cutting it for wood. The axe used to cut the tree would be rubbed with honey and butter to minimise the hurt to the tree which was considered to be a living being. Craft was seen as application of essence of Purusha (Universal Principles) to parts of nature so as to transform it into a work of art.

Treatises on Shilpa Shastras
Some known Shilpa Shastras-related manuscripts include:

See also
Vishvakarma
Hindu iconography
Hindu temple
Murti
Talamana
Vastu shastra

References

Further reading
Isabella Nardi (2006), The Theory of Citrasutras in Indian Painting, Routledge, 
Alain Daniélou, Virtue, Success, Pleasure, and Liberation: The Four Aims of Life,  - Chapter "The Thirty-two sciences" on Shilpa Shastra
S. Dabhade, 
P. K. Acharya, Indian Architecture according to the Manasara Shilpa Shastra, All 6 volumes, London (1927).
Dr. G.Gnanananda, "Sri Kashyapa Shilpa shastram (Uttarardha)-1998, Karnataka Shilpakala Academy Publication, "Sri Kashyapa Shilpa shastram (Poorvardha) Volume - 1, 2004 , Volume -2, 2006- Karnataka Shilpakala Academy Publication.
 P.N. Bose, Principles of Indian Shilpa Shastra with text of Mayamata, Oxford University Press
D.N. Shukla (1967), Shilpa Shastra, Vastuvanmaya Prakashan, Lucknow
 Pillai, G. K. (1948). The way of the silpis: Or, Hindu approach to art and science. Allahabad: Indian Press, 
V.S. Agarwala, The Heritage of Indian Art, Bombay (1964)
 Dr G.Gnanananda, "Sri Brahmeeya chitrakarma shastra ( 5 Volumes), Sanskriti Sahithya Pratisthana, Publications, Bangalore. Translated into Kannada and published in 5 volumes, source of information on Vaishnava Shilpa Shastra. # 1300 Pages.
T. Finot (1896), Les lapidaires indiens, (in French)
 Dr G Gnanananda, "Paramparika Shilpa: Nenne-Naale (2011-3rd publication)", Sanskriti Sahithya Pratisthana, Publications, Bangalore - This book is a study of traditional sculptures and Temple Architectures. 
Dr G Gnanananda, "Aalaya Darshana - A Book 12.describing mysticism and symbolism involved in Dravidian Temple. (2013, 2019) -Karnataka Shilpakala Academy Publication.     
Vastu-Shilpa Kosha, Encyclopedia of Hindu Temple architecture and Vastu/S.K.Ramachandara Rao, Delhi, Devine Books, (Lala Murari Lal Chharia Oriental series)  (Set)

Amita Sinha, Design of Settlements in the Vaastu Shastras,  Journal of Cultural Geography, Vol. 17, 1998.
Dr G Gnanananda, "Shilpaadarsh Volume-1 (1999)", "Shilpaadarsh Volume-2 (2002)", Published by Hampi University.

External links
Manasara (English translation) by Prasanna Kumar Acharya, 1933 (includes glossary)

Hindu texts
Hindu architecture
Indian architectural history
Indian iconography